Llyswen Historic District is a national historic district located at Altoona in Blair County, Pennsylvania, United States. The district includes 166 contributing buildings in a residential area of Altoona. The buildings are primarily single-family dwellings built between 1895 and 1940, and reflect a number of popular architectural styles including Colonial Revival and Queen Anne. Notable non-residential buildings include the Llyswen Methodist Episcopal Church, Ward Avenue United Presbyterian Church, Baker Elementary School and Llyswen Station.

Llyswen Station is a historic railway station designed by the Beezer Brothers.

The district was added to the National Register of Historic Places in 2002.

References

External links
 Llyswen Neighborhood, Altoona, Blair, PA: 30 data pages at Historic American Buildings Survey
 Llyswen Methodist Episcopal Church, 308 Coleridge Avenue, Altoona, Blair, PA: 1 photo, 2 data pages, and 1 photo caption page at Historic American Buildings Survey
 Llyswen Station, 218 Logan Boulevard, Altoona, Blair, PA: 3 photos, 2 data pages, and 1 photo caption page at Historic American Buildings Survey
 Baker Elementary School, Ward Avenue at Coleridge Avenue, Altoona, Blair, PA: 1 photo, 2 data pages, and 1 photo caption page at Historic American Buildings Survey
 Ward Avenue United Presbyterian Church, Northeast corner of Ward & Coleridge Avenues, Altoona, Blair, PA: 1 photo, 2 data pages, and 1 photo caption page at Historic American Buildings Survey
 Ward Avenue Presbyterian Parsonage, 101 Coleridge Avenue, Altoona, Blair, PA: 1 photo, 2 data pages, and 1 photo caption page at Historic American Buildings Survey
 Harry & Harriet Bott House, 100 Coleridge Avenue, Altoona, Blair, PA: 2 photos, 2 data pages, and 1 photo caption page at Historic American Buildings Survey
 E. A., Jr., & Marguerite Caum House, 104 Coleridge Avenue, Altoona, Blair, PA: 1 photo, 2 data pages, and 1 photo caption page at Historic American Buildings Survey
 Robert H. & Patty Fay House, 109 Coleridge Avenue, Altoona, Blair, PA: 5 photos, 2 data pages, and 1 photo caption page at Historic American Buildings Survey
 John M. & Minnie Baird House, 200 Coleridge Avenue, Altoona, Blair, PA: 2 photos, 2 data pages, and 1 photo caption page at Historic American Buildings Survey
 Franklin G. & Josephine Krall House, 201 Coleridge Avenue, Altoona, Blair, PA: 1 photo, 2 data pages, and 1 photo caption page at Historic American Buildings Survey
 Jacob & Mintie Miller House II, 202 Coleridge Avenue, Altoona, Blair, PA: 2 photos, 2 data pages, and 1 photo caption page at Historic American Buildings Survey
 John S. Seeds House II, 204 Coleridge Avenue, Altoona, Blair, PA: 2 photos, 2 data pages, and 1 photo caption page at Historic American Buildings Survey
 Corl's Store, 208 Coleridge Avenue, Altoona, Blair, PA: 1 photo, 2 data pages, and 1 photo caption page at Historic American Buildings Survey
 David G. & Margaret Stewart House, 209 Coleridge Avenue, Altoona, Blair, PA: 1 photo, 2 data pages, and 1 photo caption page at Historic American Buildings Survey
 Christopher & Lana Hite House, 213-213A Coleridge Avenue, Altoona, Blair, PA: 1 photo, 2 data pages, and 1 photo caption page at Historic American Buildings Survey
 William & Della Haines House, 216 Coleridge Avenue, Altoona, Blair, PA: 1 photo, 2 data pages, and 1 photo caption page at Historic American Buildings Survey
 Sylvester & Margaret England House, 300 Coleridge Avenue, Altoona, Blair, PA: 4 photos, 2 data pages, and 1 photo caption page at Historic American Buildings Survey
 Frank L. Zimmerman House, 303 Coleridge Avenue, Altoona, Blair, PA: 1 photo, 2 data pages, and 1 photo caption page at Historic American Buildings Survey
 Zimmerman's Store, 305 Coleridge Avenue, Altoona, Blair, PA: 1 photo, 2 data pages, and 1 photo caption page at Historic American Buildings Survey
 James E. & Flora Neff Spence House, 312 Coleridge Avenue, Altoona, Blair, PA: 1 photo, 2 data pages, and 1 photo caption page at Historic American Buildings Survey

Historic districts on the National Register of Historic Places in Pennsylvania
Neoclassical architecture in Pennsylvania
Colonial Revival architecture in Pennsylvania
Historic districts in Blair County, Pennsylvania
National Register of Historic Places in Blair County, Pennsylvania